For Life is the fifth extended play by South Korean–Chinese boy band Exo. It was released on December 19, 2016, by SM Entertainment. The album contains five tracks, including the single of the same name, in both Korean and Chinese versions. It was the last album to feature Lay before his extended hiatus.

Background and release 
On November 30, 2016, Exo was confirmed to be releasing their fifth extended play and third special winter album, after Miracles in December (2013) and Sing for You (2015). On December 13, the album's title was announced to be For Life. The album and title track's music videos, which feature Japanese actress Nanami Sakuraba alongside three Exo members Kai, Suho and Chanyeol, were released simultaneously on December 19. Unlike Exo's previous albums which were released in separate Korean and Chinese versions, For Life contains both the Korean and Chinese versions of the tracks. Profits from the album are reportedly donated to charity.

Commercial performance 
Within the first week of its release, For Life sold over 300,000 copies–Exo's second best first week album sales and the third best first week sales in the history of South Korean album sales chart Hanteo. The album debuted at number one on South Korea's Gaon Album Chart. For Life became the third best selling album in Gaon Chart in 2016 with 438,481 copies sold.

Track listing 
Credits adapted from Naver.

Charts

Weekly charts

Monthly charts

Year-end charts

Sales

Awards and nominations

Music program awards

Release history

References

External links

2016 EPs
SM Entertainment EPs
Genie Music EPs
Korean-language EPs
Chinese-language EPs
Mandopop EPs
Exo EPs
Christmas albums by South Korean artists